Ichthyomenia  is a genus of pholidoskepian solenogasters, shell-less, worm-like marine mollusks.

References

Pholidoskepia